Fieldway was a ward in the London Borough of Croydon, covering part of the New Addington estate in London in the United Kingdom. The ward formed part of the Croydon Central constituency. The population of the ward at the 2011 Census was 11,479.

The ward returned two councillors every four years to Croydon Council. At the 2006 London local elections Simon Hall and Carole Bonner were elected to the council. They stood as Labour candidates, winning with a small margin over the British National Party.

Ward results

References

External links
Council Elections 2006 results - Fieldway
Conservative Councillors for Croydon. 
London Borough of Croydon map of wards.

Former wards of the London Borough of Croydon